Catharsis is Greek word meaning "cleansing" or "purging".

Catharsis may also refer to:

Music
 Catharsis (band), a Russian metal band

Albums
 Catharsis (Elis album), 2009
 Catharsis (Machine Head album) or the title song, 2018
 Catharsis (Yob album) or the title song, 2003
 Catharsis, by Fingertips, 2006
 Catharsis, by Közi, 2004
 Catharsis, by Sky-Hi, 2016
 Catharsis, an EP by Sworn In, 2011

Songs
 "Catharsis", by Anthrax from Volume 8: The Threat Is Real, 1998
 "Catharsis", by Band-Maid from Conqueror, 2019
 "Catharsis", by Pitchshifter from Industrial, 1991
 "Catharsis", by Versailles from Jubilee, 2010

Other uses
 Catharsis (medicine), the effect of a cathartic, a substance that accelerates defecation
 Catharsis (organization), a charitable organization in Tbilisi, Georgia

See also
 Katharsis (disambiguation)
 Catharisis, a 2003 Japanese TV film